Crown and Whip (German: Um Krone und Peitsche) is a 1919 German silent film directed by Fern Andra and Georg Bluen and starring Andra, Olga Engl and Reinhold Schünzel. It premiered at the Marmorhaus in Berlin.

Cast
 Fern Andra
 Olga Engl
 Reinhold Schünzel
 Wilhelm Diegelmann
 Josef Peterhans
 Alice König
 Vera Fischer
 Rudolf Hilberg

References

Bibliography
 Bock, Hans-Michael & Bergfelder, Tim. The Concise CineGraph. Encyclopedia of German Cinema. Berghahn Books, 2009.

External links

1919 films
Films of the Weimar Republic
German silent feature films
Films directed by Fern Andra
German black-and-white films
Circus films
1910s German films